Araneus juniperi is a species of spider in the orb weaver family (Araneidae). It is found in the USA and Canada.

References

Further reading

External links

 

Araneus
Spiders described in 1884